A gubernatorial election was held on 11 March 2018 to elect the next governor of , a prefecture of Japan located in the Chūbu region on Honshu island.

Candidates 
Masanori Tanimoto, elected since 1994 was endorsed by SDP, LDP and Komeito.
Emi Kokura, former labor union worker, JCP.

Results

References 

2018 elections in Japan
Ishikawa gubernational elections
March 2018 events in Japan